The Willow Brook Connector is a  unsigned expressway in the town of Berlin, Connecticut. The road is designated but not signed as State Road 571. It gets its name from Willow Brook Park, which begins on the north side of the roadway as one heads into the city of New Britain, or to New Britain Stadium for a baseball game.

Route description
The expressway begins at the intersection of Route 71A (High Road) and Route 372 (Corbin Avenue) at the northern end of Berlin (near the New Britain city line). It proceeds eastward through Willow Brook and Hungerford Parks. The highway has an unnumbered interchange with Route 71 about  later. The highway ends half a mile later as it merges into southbound Route 9. Access from Route 9 is only possible from the northbound direction via Exit 24.

History
The road opened in the early 1960s when what would become the Route 72 Expressway (part of Route 9 today) opened from this road south to the junction of the Berlin Turnpike (U.S. Route 5/Route 15) in Berlin. The entire highway has also been designated as part of the Polish Legion of American Veterans Memorial Highway.

Junction list
As part of a signing project in 2020, the CT 71 exit will receive a number.

See also

References

External links

State highways in Connecticut
Transportation in Hartford County, Connecticut
Berlin, Connecticut